Brenan Park is a  urban park situated in the western suburbs of Sydney, New South Wales, Australia. Primarily categorised as a sports field, the reserve contains an open grassland, bushland and recreational areas within the vicinity of native plants, such as eucalyptus trees. It is named after John Ryan Brenan, who founded the suburb of Smithfield in 1836. 

Artificially terraced, Brenan Park was established in the early 1980s and it is one of the largest reserves in the City of Fairfield, and one of the largest non-golf course green spaces in the Western Sydney region.

History
The shape of Brenan Park appears on the first survey design, in 1838, of the market town sketched for John Ryan Brenan. Brenan Park was planned to be a housing subdivision and a market area in 1938, with its triangular shape fashioned to take advantage of the topography and views of the surrounding district. The housing subdivision was never constructed. The site was used as a sewage disposal depot and landfill until 1980, where it was proclaimed as unhealthy building land in 1981. Subsequently, it was re-landscaped and eventually developed into a reserve.

Geography
The reserve is located in the suburb of Smithfield, and is bordered by Cumberland Highway, Brenan and Bourke Streets, which all give good passive surveillance opportunities from close residences and contiguous roads. The park's surrounds are mainly single-story houses. 

The elevated regions in the park are situated alongside Bourke Street, where they would provide a panoramic view of the greater western Sydney area and even the Sydney central business district.

Ecology
Indigenous trees and shrubs are abundant in the park, with dominant vegetation species being Melaleuca quinquenervia (near the tennis courts), Eucalyptus moluccana
(near the car park in Brenan Street), Casuarina glauca, Callistemon viminalis, Paperbark, Acacia, Lomandra and Eucalyptus bosistoana, most of which have large canopies that provide shade.

The boundary along the top part of Bourke Street and near Cumberland Highway is thickly planted with an avenue of trees and shrubs, which provide a sense of entry to the park. Its trees represent a link to the Cumberland Plain Woodland that covered most of Fairfield local government area before European settlement. There is a shrubby, dry sclerophyll bushland area to the south of the park, near Cumberland Highway.

The corner of Brenan Street and Cumberland Highway provides good viewing site for birdwatching as dozens of bird species flock to the area to feed. Pigeons, ravens, magpies, galahs and crested pigeons are common sightings in the park, and can be seen in flocks feeding off ground food, most especially pigeons and ravens. Bird feeding is not encouraged in the park.

Features

The park features six tennis courts, nine soccer fields (six which are full-sized), three cricket pitches, baseball and softball diamonds, three children's playgrounds, picnic areas (with barbeque), an outdoor gym and a  walking track (shared with cycling) that circuits the park. The park has open space which can be used for kiting and other activities when they are not being used for sport.

The park is floodlit and can be used at nights. Amenity blocks include a community hall, toilet facilities, kiosks and change rooms. The sports fields and the community hall are hired to a number of community groups, schools and clubs. These facilities have been used for COVID-19 testing.

Clubs
The sports fields are hired by these sporting groups:
 Smithfield RSL Cricket Club
 Smithfield RSL Soccer Club
 Fairfield Patrician Brothers Soccer Club
 Smithfield RSL Baseball Club

Gallery

See also

Wetherill Park Nature Reserve
Fairfield Park Precinct
Western Sydney Parklands
Central Gardens Nature Reserve
Rosford Street Reserve

References

1981 establishments in Australia
Parks in Sydney
Nature reserves in New South Wales
Protected areas established in 1981
Sports venues in Sydney
Remnant urban bushland
Parks established in 1981
City of Fairfield